The Lying Game is an American television drama series, that aired on ABC Family, from August 15, 2011 to March 12, 2013 for a total of two seasons and 30 episodes. The series follows Emma Becker (Alexandra Chando), a foster kid that can't catch a break who finds out she has an identical twin sister named Sutton Mercer, who has the life Emma always wanted. The network green-lighted the series on February 22, 2011. On July 15, 2013, ABC Family officially cancelled the series.

Series overview

Episodes

Season 1 (2011–12)

Season 2 (2013)

References

External links
 List of The Lying Game episodes at TheFutoncritic.com
 List of The Lying Game episodes at MSN TV
 List of The Lying Game episodes at ABC Spark

Lists of American teen drama television series episodes